Kecskemét is a district in northern part of Bács-Kiskun County. Kecskemét is also the name of the town where the district seat is found. The district is located in the Southern Great Plain Statistical Region.

Geography 
Kecskemét District borders with Dabas District and Cegléd District (Pest County) to the north, Nagykőrös District (Pest County) to the northeast, Tiszakécske District to the east, Kiskunfélegyháza District to the south, Kiskőrös District and Kunszentmiklós District to the west. The number of the inhabited places in Kecskemét District is 16.

Municipalities 
The district has 1 urban county, 2 towns and 13 villages.
(ordered by population, as of 1 January 2014)

The bolded municipalities are cities.

Demographics

In 2011, it had a population of 155,481 and the population density was 128/km².

Ethnicity
Besides the Hungarian majority, the main minorities are the German and Roma (approx. 1,750), Romanian (700), Croat (150), Russian and Serb (200), Slovak, Bulgarian and Ukrainian (100).

Total population (2011 census): 155,481
Ethnic groups (2011 census): Identified themselves: 141,203 persons:
Hungarians: 134,683 (95.38%)
Germans: 1,748 (1.24%)
Gypsies: 1,734 (1.23%)
Others and indefinable: 3,038 (2.15%)
Approx. 14,000 persons in Kecskemét District did not declare their ethnic group at the 2011 census.

Religion
Religious adherence in the county according to 2011 census:

Catholic – 70,482 (Roman Catholic – 70,032; Greek Catholic – 424);
Reformed – 15,788;
Evangelical – 1,575;
other religions – 2,494; 
Non-religious – 21,788; 
Atheism – 1,887;
Undeclared – 41,467.

Gallery

See also
List of cities and towns of Hungary

References

External links
 Postal codes of the Kecskemét District

Districts in Bács-Kiskun County